Letters to Sofija is a 2013 Lithuanian biographical film about the life of Mikalojus Konstantinas Čiurlionis.

Cast 
 Rokas Zubovas as Mikalojus Konstantinas Čiurlionis
 Marija Korenkaitė as Sofija Kymantaitė
 Saulius Balandis as Prince Michal Oginski
  as Orator

References

External links 

2013 biographical drama films
2013 films
2013 drama films
Lithuanian drama films
Films about composers